Haylock is a surname. Notable people with the surname include:

 Garry Haylock (born 1970), English footballer and manager
 Kendra Haylock (born 1999), Honduran footballer
 Paul Haylock (born 1963), English footballer
 Roy Haylock (born 1975), American drag queen also known as Bianca Del Rio